Dame Amanda Louise Yip ( Kay), DBE is a British High Court judge.

Yip was born in Liverpool on the 23rd of April 1969, she is the daughter of Sir John Kay, a Lord Justice of Appeal. Her brother is international rugby union footballer Ben Kay.

She was educated at the Merchant Taylors' Girls' School and Emmanuel College, Cambridge, where she studied law. She was called to the bar by Gray's Inn in 1991 and practised at Exchange Chambers in Liverpool, specialising in personal injury and clinical negligence work. She was appointed a Recorder in 2009, Queen's Counsel in 2011, and a deputy High Court judge in 2013.

Yip was appointed a Justice of the High Court in 2017, on the retirement of Mr Justice Wyn Williams, and assigned to the Queen's Bench Division. She received the customary appointment of Dame Commander of the Order of the British Empire the same year.

She married David Yip in 1991, they have one son and two daughters.

References 

Dames Commander of the Order of the British Empire
Queen's Bench Division judges
People educated at Merchant Taylors' Girls' School
Alumni of Emmanuel College, Cambridge
English King's Counsel
English barristers
21st-century King's Counsel
1969 births
Living people
Lawyers from Liverpool